Stillingia paucidentata, the Mojave toothleaf, is a species of flowering plant in the spurge family, Euphorbiaceae. The Mojave toothleaf is endemic to southeastern California in the United States. It may occur in nearby western Arizona, but no specimens from that state have been conclusively confirmed. It grows in sandy areas and dry slopes, flowering between March and May and fruiting in May and June.

It was described by Sereno Watson in 1879.

References

paucidentata
Plants described in 1879
Endemic flora of California
Flora without expected TNC conservation status